The Church of San Andrés Apóstol (Spanish: Iglesia Parroquial de San Andrés Apóstol) is a church located in Cubas de la Sagra, Spain. It was declared Bien de Interés Cultural in 1983.

References 

Andres Apostol
Bien de Interés Cultural landmarks in the Community of Madrid